Manuel Joseph "Jim" Rivera (July 22, 1921 – November 13, 2017) was an American professional baseball outfielder. He played for three Major League Baseball (MLB) teams over ten seasons: St. Louis Browns (1952), Chicago White Sox (1952–1961), and Kansas City Athletics (1961).

Career
Rivera was born to Puerto Rican migrants in New York City. He was first called "Jim" when he was 17, "Big Jim" when he started playing for the Chicago White Sox during the 1952 season, and "Jungle Jim" in 1953 which was initiated by Chicago Sun-Times sports writer Edgar Munzel. This was due largely to his unorthodox playing style, and for his highly extroverted personality.  Rivera threw and batted left-handed; he stood 6 feet tall and weighed 196 pounds during his playing days.

In 1944, Rivera was charged with raping and assault an Army officer's daughter while in the military. He was found guilty of attempted rape and sentenced to life in prison. Rivera's sentence was later reduced, and he was paroled in 1949. In 1953, he led the American League in triples (16) and in 1955 in stolen bases with 25. He was a sparkplug for the 1950s Go-Go White Sox team which eventually won the American League pennant in 1959.

A smart and fast runner, Rivera ran the bases with abandon, sliding into bases on his belly before it was fashionable, and made many a game-saving catch playing right field. A ground ball hitter, he used his speed to full advantage and was a much tougher in clutch situations. However, in that year's World Series, which the White Sox lost in six games to the Los Angeles Dodgers, Rivera went hitless in 11 at-bats.

Rivera had a .256 lifetime batting average with 83 home runs, 422 RBIs, 503 runs, 155 doubles, and 56 triples in 1,171 games played. He also had a career total of 160 stolen bases and a lifetime .978 fielding average.

At age 40, Rivera appeared in 64 games for the Kansas City A's during the 1961 season, hitting .241 to cap his career. Rivera said Whitey Ford was the "toughest" pitcher he ever faced and he liked it when he was called "Big Jim."

Rivera would go on to be a part-owner and manager for both the Fort Wayne Scouts (1979) and Fort Wayne Huggie Bears (1980) who played in two men's professional softball leagues.   

Rivera died on November 13, 2017, at the age of 96.

See also
 List of Major League Baseball annual triples leaders
 List of Major League Baseball annual stolen base leaders

References

External links

 Smiley, Richard, Jim Rivera, SABR Baseball Biography Project

1921 births
2017 deaths
American expatriate baseball players in Mexico
American League stolen base champions
American sportspeople of Puerto Rican descent
Atlanta Crackers players
Baseball players from New York (state)
Charros de Jalisco players
Chicago White Sox players
Gainesville G-Men players
Indianapolis Indians players
Kansas City Athletics players
Major League Baseball first basemen
Major League Baseball outfielders
Mexican League baseball managers
Pacific Coast League MVP award winners
Pensacola Fliers players
Seattle Rainiers players
St. Louis Browns players
Tigres del México players
American people convicted of attempted rape
American people convicted of assault
American prisoners sentenced to life imprisonment
United States Army personnel who were court-martialed
United States Army Air Forces personnel of World War II
Prisoners sentenced to life imprisonment by the United States military